Danny and the Human Zoo is a British drama television film that first broadcast on BBC One on 31 August 2015. The ninety-minute film, written by Lenny Henry and directed by Destiny Ekaragha, is a fictionalised account of the former's life as a teenager in 1970s Dudley.

Production
The film was commissioned by Charlotte Moore and Ben Stephenson. The head of BBC One wanted to give black actors more prominent television roles. The executive producers are Caroline Hollick, Nicola Shindler and Polly Hill.

References

External links
 

2015 British television series debuts
2015 television films
2015 films
Television series by Red Production Company
BBC television dramas
2010s English-language films